Revealing is an album by American guitarist James Blood Ulmer featuring George Adams, Cecil McBee, and Doug Hammond recorded in 1977 and released for the first time in 1990 on the In + Out label.

Reception
Allmusic awarded the album 4 stars, and reviewer Thom Jurek states, "Revealing is more than just fascinating listening to hear the development in Blood Ulmer's playing and compositional ideas, it's a solid jazz date with visionary players taking a new turn with the music and seeing how fast they can drive it down the road. While it does not contain the sheer drama of Tales of Captain Black or Are You Glad to Be in America? because it's a fairly laid-back date, it does contain all of their musical qualities".

Track listing
All compositions by James Blood Ulmer
 "Revealing" - 8:15  
 "Raw Groove" - 8:49  
 "Overtime" - 9:01  
 "Love Nest" - 10:05

Personnel
James Blood Ulmer - guitar
George Adams – tenor saxophone
Cecil McBee - bass
Doug Hammond - drums

References

1990 albums
James Blood Ulmer albums